Roth is a river of Bavaria, Germany. It is a right tributary of the Rednitz in the town Roth.

See also

List of rivers of Bavaria

References

Rivers of Bavaria
Rivers of Germany